The AA Jefferson District is a district in the Virginia High School League. There are eight member schools. The District is named in honor of Thomas Jefferson, and as might be guessed, member schools are clustered around Charlottesville. The District was created in the late 1990s from parts of the Valley and Battlefield Districts, as increased enrollment had forced Fluvanna County and William Monroe to become Group AA schools. Since 2013, the district is used only for regular season, as the members compete in the playoffs at the 3A, 4A, or 5A level.

Member schools
Albemarle Patriots, Charlottesville
Charlottesville Black Knights, Charlottesville
Fluvanna County Flying Flucos, Palmyra
Louisa County Lions, Mineral
Monticello Mustangs, Charlottesville
Orange County Fighting Hornets, Orange
Goochland Bulldogs, Goochland
Western Albemarle Warriors, Crozet

External links
 Official athletic site 

Virginia High School League